Rayi Ratna Sundara Rao (born 1934; died 1992) was a prolific writer, theologian and comparative religion scholar who once was the principal of the Gurukul Lutheran Theological College, Chennai, affiliated to India's first university, the Senate of Serampore College (University).

Some of his writings are kept in digitized versions at the National Library of India and  the Indian Institute of Science.

In a 2014 study, Katherine C. Zubko of the University of North Carolina at Asheville highlights that Sundara Rao's assumption of bhakti was a more inward expression for concern for others cutting across religious boundaries. In fact, Sundara Rao's treatise, "Bhakti Theology in the Telugu Hymnal" had struck new ground in finding the origins of the bhakti element in Christian hymns in the Telugu language. The missiologist, Roger E. Hedlund, asserted that along with the Bible, the Christian Hymnal in Telugu also formed the main bulwark of Christian spiritual life for the Telugu folk and of equal use to both the non-literates and the literates as well. In such a setting of the importance of the Telugu Hymnal, Sundara Rao's study reiterated the fact that bhakti had been a binding factor for the early Christians in the Telugu-speaking states of Andhra Pradesh and Telangana. While this has been so, new studies in 2014 by the Harvard scholars, Ch. Vasantha Rao and John B. Carman indicate that the element of bhakti had little inroad into the otherwise rural India which in their study wholly depended on folk element.

Studies
Sundara Rao had his ministerial formation at the Lutheran Theological College in Rajahmundry, affiliated to the India's first university, the Senate of Serampore College, under the principalship of G. Devasahayam. He graduated in 1960 and was awarded a L. Th. degree by then registrar of the university, Chetti Devasahayam, CBCNC. Rao later upgraded his qualifications by pursuing a Bachelor of Divinity degree, awarded by the university, again during the registrarship of Devasahayam.

For language studies, Sundara Rao enrolled for a graduate and postgraduate programme in Telugu at the Andhra University and the Venkateshwara University which awarded him with a Bachelor of Arts and a Master of Arts respectively. He also researched from 1976 to 1980 at the University of Wisconsin, Madison submitting a dissertation in 1981 entitled "The bhakti element in Āndhra Kraistava Kīrtanalu : an intensive study of the phenomenon of bhakti, a Sanskrit word for devotion, as presented in the Telugu Christian Hymnal".

Ecclesiastical career
Sundara Rao was a pastor of the Andhra Evangelical Lutheran Church Society and ministered in congregations until his appointment as lecturer in 1973 at the Andhra Christian Theological College in Hyderabad where he taught in an ecumenical setting with other Protestant congregations. In fact, the Lutheran Theological College, Rajahmundry where he had his ministerial formation, amalgamated in 1964 with Andhra Christian Theological College, a special purpose entity which comprised four existing seminaries:
 the Andhra Union Theological College, Dornakal comprising the Anglicans and the Methodists
 the Baptist Theological Seminary, Kakinada comprising the Baptists (Canadian)
 the Lutheran Theological College, Rajahmundry comprising the Lutherans (American and German)
 the Ramayapatnam Baptist Theological Seminary, Ramayapatnam comprising the Baptists (American).

Sundara Rao taught in the special purpose entity from 1973 to 1988 when the college was led by three church societies, namely the Church of South India, the Convention of Baptist Churches of Northern Circars and the Samavesam of Telugu Baptist Churches led by Victor Premasagar, K. David and S. Joseph respectively.

From 1988 onwards, Sundara Rao accepted a teaching assignment at the Gurukul Lutheran Theological College in Chennai and taught religions. On 1 April 1992, he was made principal of the college, a role which brought greater responsibilities. On 9 November 1992, he died in Chennai.

Writings

Ravela Joseph and Suneel Bhanu compiled a Bibliography of original Christian writings in India in Telugu in 1993 which included the writings of Sundara Rao. It was published by the Board of Theological Education of the Senate of Serampore College.

 No date: Essays on Special Christian Themes (in Telugu) unpublished manuscript listed in Joseph and Suneel Bhanu 
 No date: Renaissance Movements (in Telugu), unpublished manuscript listed in Joseph and Suneel Bhanu  
 1963: Prayer (in Telugu), Lutheran Publishing House, Guntur, 1963. Listed in Joseph and Suneel Bhanu  
 1976: Telugulo Kraistava Sahityam (in Telugu) Secunderabad, 1976. Listed in Joseph and Suneel Bhanu (reprint in 1989)
 1983: Bhakti theology in the Telugu hymnal,
 1986: Mahākavi Jāṣuva vyaktitvaṃ, kavitvaṃ (in Telugu)
 1987: Bābālu, Svāmījīlu, Gurumahārājulu (in Telugu)
 1989: A critical look at Ambedkar's conversion
 1990: Mission and evangelism in India
 1990: The Church in Andhra Pradesh

Honours
In 1975, the Kadapa-based Kala Kendriya Sangham and Yuva Rachayitala Sangham conferred upon Sundara Rao the title of Sahitya Vibhushan.  Subsequently in 1982, the Secunderabad-based Kraistava Sahitya Vihaaram awarded him a Sahitya Ratna.

Further reading

References
Notes

Senate of Serampore College (University) alumni
Andhra University alumni
Sri Venkateswara University alumni
University of Wisconsin–Madison alumni
1934 births
1992 deaths
Telugu people
Scholars from Andhra Pradesh
Indian lecturers
20th-century Lutheran clergy
Indian Christian theologians
Lutheran writers
20th-century Indian translators
Christian clergy from Andhra Pradesh
Academic staff of the Senate of Serampore College (University)
Religious studies scholars